thumb|Saturn's Great White Spot in 2011.

The Great White Spot, also known as Great White Oval, on Saturn, named by analogy to Jupiter's Great Red Spot, are periodic storms that are large enough to be visible from Earth by telescope by their characteristic white appearance. The spots can be several thousands of kilometers wide.

The Cassini orbiter was able to track the 2010–11 instance of the storm, also known as the Northern Electrostatic Disturbance, because of an increase in radio and plasma interference, or the Great Springtime Storm.

Cassini data has revealed a loss of acetylene in the white clouds, an increase of phosphine, and an unusual temperature drop in the center of the storm. After the visible aspects of the storm subsided, in 2012, a "belch" of heat and ethylene was emitted from two hotspots that merged.

Occurrence
The phenomenon is somewhat periodic at 28.5-year intervals, when Saturn's northern hemisphere tilts most toward the Sun. The following is a list of recorded sightings.

 1876 – Observed by Asaph Hall.  He used the white spots to determine the planet's period of rotation.
 1903 – Observed by Edward Barnard.
 1933 – Observed by Will Hay, comic actor and amateur astronomer. Until recent times the most celebrated observation.
 1960 – Observed by JH Botham (South Africa).
 1990 – Observed by Stuart Wilber, from 24 September through November.
 1994 – Studied by ground-based observers and the Hubble Space Telescope.
 2006 – Observed by Erick Bondoux and Jean-Luc Dauvergne.
 2010 – First observed by Anthony Wesley, photographed by Cassini space probe 2010–11.

That none were recorded before 1876 is a mystery, in some ways akin to the long observational gap of the Great Red Spot in the 18th and early 19th centuries; the 1876 Great White Spot (GWS) was extremely prominent, being visible in apertures as small as 60 mm.  It is not known if the earlier record was simply poor, or if the 1876 GWS was truly a first for the telescopic era.  Some believe that neither scenario is likely.

In 1992, Mark Kidger described three significant GWS patterns:
The GWSs alternate in latitude, with one apparition being limited to the North Temperate Zone (NTZ) or higher, and the following being limited to the Equatorial Zone (EZ). For instance, the 1960 GWS was high-latitude, and the 1990 GWS was equatorial.
The high-latitude GWSs recur at a slightly shorter interval than the equatorial GWSs (~27 versus ~30 years).
The high-latitude GWSs tend to be much less prominent than their equatorial counterparts.

Based on these apparent regularities, in 1992 Kidger forecasted (incorrectly, given the 2010-11 storm) that the next GWS would occur in the North Temperate Zone in 2016, and would probably be less spectacular than the 1990 GWS.

Characteristics and causes
The Great White Spot typically begins as discrete "spots", but then rapidly expands in longitude, as the 1933 and 1990 GWSs did; in fact, the latter eventually lengthened enough to encircle the planet.

Though computer modeling had by the early 1990s suggested these massive atmospheric upwellings were caused by thermal instability, in 2015 two Caltech planetary scientists proposed a more detailed mechanism. The theory is that as Saturn's upper atmosphere undergoes seasonal cooling, it first gets less dense as the heavier water rains out, passes a density minimum, and then gets more dense as the remaining hydrogen and helium continue to cool. Low-density upper-layer gases tend to suppress convection, but high-density upper layers are unstable and cause a thunderstorm when they break into lower layers. The theory is that the storms are significantly delayed from the winter solstice due to the time it takes for the very large atmosphere to cool. The team proposes that similar storms are not seen on Jupiter because that planet has less water vapor in its upper atmosphere.

Saturn's rings block the view of the northern hemisphere from Earth during the winter solstice, so historical data on the GWS is unavailable during this season, but the Cassini space probe has been able to observe the whole planet since it arrived shortly after the winter solstice in 2004.

See also

 Great Dark Spot
 Great Red Spot
 Dragon Storm
 Extraterrestrial cyclone
 Kármán vortex street

References

Notes
 Article on Saturn's Northern Electrostatic Disturbance  on Sky and Telescope
 1990/1   Hubble Space Telescope image
 2006: observed with a 12" telescope by amateurs near Paris.
 Volunteers Help NASA Track Return of the Dragon

External links
The Great White Spot at ESA/Hubble
Christopher Go's Saturn Website Pictures of Saturn's Northern Electrostatic Disturbance (2011)

Saturn
Planetary spots
Storms
1876 in science